Anja Schneiderheinze-Stöckel (born 8 April 1978 in Erfurt) is a German bobsledder who has competed since 2001. At the 2006 Winter Olympics in Turin, she won gold in the two-woman event with teammate Sandra Kiriasis.

The pair also won two medals at the FIBT World Championships with a gold in 2005 and a silver in 2004.

References

Bobsleigh two-woman Olympic medalists since 2002

FIBT profile
Official website

External links 

 
 
 
 
 

1978 births
Living people
Sportspeople from Erfurt
German female bobsledders
Bobsledders at the 2006 Winter Olympics
Bobsledders at the 2014 Winter Olympics
Olympic bobsledders of Germany
Olympic gold medalists for Germany
Olympic medalists in bobsleigh
Medalists at the 2006 Winter Olympics
21st-century German women